The Devastator Assemblage is a geological formation comprising a portion of the Mount Meager massif in southwestern British Columbia, Canada. It is named after Devastator Peak (also known as The Devastator), the lowest and southernmost subsidiary peak of Meager. The south and west flanks of Pylon Peak and Devastator Peak are made of The Devastator Assemblage rocks.

It consists of subvolcanic intrusions of a partly preserved volcanic vent and felsic volcanic rocks that were erupted from the vent. The eastern portion of The Devastator Assemblage comprises the partly preserved vent and felsic volcanic rocks while the western portion consists of crudely layered tephra.

See also
Capricorn Assemblage
Job Assemblage
List of Cascade volcanoes
List of volcanoes in Canada
Mosaic Assemblage
Plinth Assemblage
Pylon Assemblage
Volcanology of Western Canada

References

Mount Meager massif
Volcanism of British Columbia
Geologic formations of British Columbia
Pleistocene volcanism